Bassorah Fossa is a trough south of Ali Baba crater on Saturn's moon Enceladus.  Bassorah Fossa was first seen in Voyager 2 images.  It is located at 45.4° north, 6.3° west, and is 131 kilometers long.

Bassorah Fossa is named after the city of Basra, Iraq, from which Sindbad embarked on his third voyage in the Arabian Nights.

Surface features of Enceladus